Tasha Holiday is an American contemporary R&B singer who was signed to MCA Records in the 1990s. Her biggest success  was with the single "Just the Way You Like It" which peaked in the top thirty of the Billboard R&B singles chart, and became one of BET's most played music videos. Billboard Magazine called her album Just the Way You Like It "a promising debut". She also sang vocals on the single "Don't You Worry" by reggae artist Ruffa.

In 2006, she appeared on the track "Life So Real" (with Da Unknown) on the Lil' O album Neva Lay Down Vol. 1 [Explicit].

In 2011, she worked with producer Mike Nitty and a single, "I Used To Love You" was released on YouTube on June 22, 2011. They also premiered a song "They Want Me to Stop" earlier that year.

In 2014, two more collaborations between Nitty and Holiday were released ("Stop Playin'" and "Can't Stop Runnin'") on Nitty's SoundCloud account. The following year, she collaborated with Nookie on the song "Dreams."

Discography

Albums

Studio albums
Just the Way You Like It (1997)

EPs
The Acapellas (EP) (1996)

Singles

References

1970s births
Date of birth missing (living people)
Living people
MCA Records artists
Musicians from Atlantic City, New Jersey
Singers from New Jersey
21st-century American singers